Rossville is an unincorporated community in Atascosa County, in the U.S. state of Texas. According to the Handbook of Texas, the community had a population of 200 in 2000. It is located within the San Antonio metropolitan area.

History
José Antonio Navarro once owned the community and bought this plot of land and passed it along to his son, J. A. George Navarro, which also included a tract of land on both sides of the Atascosa River. He had the land surveyed in the early 1870s and divided it into long, narrow strips to provide access to the river. Settlers started arriving and building homes on the land. Scottish immigrant John Ross married J.A.G. Navarro's daughter, Maria Antonia, and her father gave her  of land. They had moved to the area from San Antonio and lived in their home on the east bank of the river until they died. Rossville was then founded by John and his brother, W.F.M. Ross, in 1873. A post office was established at Rossville in January 1887 and remained in operation until 1947, with W.F.M. Ross as postmaster. Cotton and livestock were raised in Rossville and developed two churches, three stores, a cotton gin, and a bakery by the end of that century. Area residents had occupations of a veterinarian, a cobbler, and a midwife. It had more than 300 residents toward the end of the 1890s. It developed a Catholic church at the start of the 20th century. The San Antonio-to-Laredo railroad passed Rossville and caused people to leave the community. Its population went down to 150 by 1915. The boll weevil invaded cotton crops as well. The new crops grown in Rossville were watermelons, peanuts, and vegetables and were taken to San Antonio to be sold. Farmers in the community left during the Great Depression. The church buildings were demolished while two stores remained in operation. The community then got mail delivered from Poteet. Rossville got a community center in 1986 and hosted a voting precinct for 507 registered voters. Elections continue to be held there today. It is also used as a meeting place for a 4-H Club, a rabies clinic, and a site for assisting the homeless, family reunions, neighborhood watch projects, fire department training classes, and social gatherings. The community had a population of 200 in 2000.

The Ross brothers also noticed fertile soil and plentiful gaming opportunities in the area. The community also had a saloon in operation. Many of the community's first settlers are buried in the cemetery. The cemetery sits on an acre of land that was donated to John Ross's wife.

Geography

Education
Rossville had a one-room schoolhouse at the end of the 19th century and grew to two classrooms by the start of the 20th century. The school consolidated with the Poteet Independent School District in 1955 and was demolished. The community continues to be served by the Poteet ISD to this day.

References

Unincorporated communities in Atascosa County, Texas
Unincorporated communities in Texas